Lovricia is a genus of ground beetles in the family Carabidae. There are at least two described species in Lovricia, found in Croatia.

Species
These two species belong to the genus Lovricia:
 Lovricia aenigmatica Lakota; Mlejnek & Jalzic, 2002
 Lovricia jalzici Pretner, 1979

References

Trechinae